Michael Hartmann (born June 13, 1994) is an American association football player who plays as a goalkeeper for Oskarshamns AIK in the Ettan Sodra.

Raised in Medford, New Jersey, Hartmann played prep soccer at Shawnee High School.

Career

College
Hartmann played four years of college soccer at Division II school, Caldwell University between 2012 and 2015. During his senior year, Hartmann was also part of the Ocean City Nor'easters side who competed in the USL PDL.

Professional
Hartmann had trials in Norway before joining 3. divisjon team Kolstad FK, but couldn't play with the team due to work permit issues. He later has trials with Swedish fourth-tier side Linköping City, who he signed with and played with for three seasons, achieving promotion to the third-tier in 2018.

In January 2020, Hartmann joined Finnish top division side FC Haka. He registered ten league appearances and eight in the cup before leaving the club.

In 2021, Hartmann returned to Sweden, signing with third-tier club, Oskarshamns AIK.

References

External links

1994 births
Living people
American expatriate soccer players
American expatriate sportspeople in Finland
American expatriate sportspeople in Norway
American expatriate sportspeople in Sweden
American soccer players
Association football goalkeepers
Ocean City Nor'easters players
FC Linköping City players
FC Haka players
People from Medford, New Jersey
Shawnee High School (New Jersey) alumni
Soccer players from New Jersey
Sportspeople from Burlington County, New Jersey
Ettan Fotboll players
Division 2 (Swedish football) players
USL League Two players